Coleophora ochripennella is a species of moth from the family Coleophoridae. It is found from Germany and Poland to the Pyrenees, Italy and Greece.

The larvae feed on Ballota nigra, Glechoma hederacea, Lamium album, Lamium purpureum, Stachys officinalis and Stachys sylvatica. The mouth angle is 80 to 90 degrees, and the case is slightly compressed. Larvae can be found from October to May.

References

ochripennella
Moths described in 1849
Moths of Europe